Live at Montreux is the name of live concert releases from Montreux Sounds and Eagle Vision, on CD and/or DVD, by various musicians, usually referring to recordings at the Montreux Jazz Festival:

 Tori Amos: Live at Montreux 1991/1992
 The Atlantic Family Live at Montreux (1978)
 Dennis Brown (1957–1999): Live at Montreux
 Johnny Cash (1932–2003): Live at Montreux 1994 (DVD)
 Ray Charles (1930–2004): Live at Montreux 1997
 Phil Collins (born 1951): Live at Montreux
 Alice Cooper: Live at Montreux (CD/DVD)
 Miles Davis & Quincy Jones: Miles & Quincy Live at Montreux
 Deep Purple: Live at Montreux 1996, Live at Montreux 2006, Live at Montreux 2011
 Mink DeVille: Live at Montreaux 1982
 The Dubliners: Live at Montreux
 Steve Earle: Live at Montreux 2005
 Bill Evans (1929–1980): Live at Montreux
 Rachelle Ferrell (born 1964): Live in Montreux 1991–97
 Rory Gallagher: Live at Montreux
 Andrew Hill (jazz musician): Live at Montreux
 Bobbi Humphrey: Bobbi Humphrey Live: Cookin' with Blue Note at Montreux
 Bobby Hutcherson: Live at Montreux
 Bob James (musician) (born 1939): Live at Montreux
 Jamiroquai: Live at Montreux 2003 (DVD)
 Jethro Tull (band): Live At Montreux 2003 (2CD/DVD)
 King Sunny Adé (born 1946): Live at Montreux 1982
 Korn: Korn: Live in Montreux 2004 (DVD)
 Charles Lloyd: Montreux 82
 Gary Moore: Gary Moore & The Midnight Blues Band – Live at Montreux 1990, Live at Montreux 2010
 Les McCann: Live at Montreux
 Carmen McRae (1922–1994): Live at Montreux
 Mingus Dynasty (band): Live at Montreux
 Modern Jazz Quartet: Together Again: Live at the Montreux Jazz Festival '82 (Pablo, 1982)
 Alanis Morissette: Live at Montreux 2012
 Van Morrison: Live at Montreux 1980/1974
 Mike Oldfield: Live at Montreux 1981
 Rockpile: Live at Montreux 1980
 Nile Rodgers, & Chic: Live at Montreux 2004
 Peter Tosh (1944–1987): Live at Montreux 1979
 Bonnie Raitt (born 1949): Live at Montreux 1977 (DVD)
 Run-D.M.C.: Live at Montreux 2001
 Marlena Shaw: Live at Montreux
 Sun Ra: Live at Montreux (Sun Ra album)
 Stevie Ray Vaughan: Live at Montreux 1982 & 1985
 Wu-Tang Clan: Live at Montreux 2007
 Yes (band): Live at Montreux 2003
 ZZ Top: Live at Montreux 2013